Konstantin Elbrusovich Kertanov (born 22 July 1995) is a Russian professional football player. He plays for FC Veles Moscow.

Club career
He made his debut in the Russian Premier League on 8 December 2012 for FC Krylia Sovetov Samara in a game against FC Amkar Perm.

External links
 
 Profile by Football National League

References

1995 births
People from Beslan
Sportspeople from North Ossetia–Alania
Living people
Russian footballers
Association football midfielders
PFC Krylia Sovetov Samara players
FC Kuban Krasnodar players
FC Torpedo Moscow players
FC Veles Moscow players
Russian Premier League players
Russian First League players
Russian Second League players